Karmaphal Daata Shani is an Indian mythological television series, which aired from 7 November 2016 to 9 March 2018 on Colors TV. The series was produced by Swastik Productions of Siddharth Kumar Tewary.

Plot
The story of the series is based on the life of God Shani, who is known for his wrath. The serial also shows Brahma, Vishnu and Shiva as Shani's mentors.
It also shows Shani's tough childhood, getting the title of karmaphaldaata, his downfall, his return to Suryalok, marriage, getting his wife's curse and finally his return as Karmphaldaata.The story is about Shani, son of suryadev and Chaaya who is the shadow form of Sandhya, first wife of suryadev and with Sandhya, suryadev has two children namely Yama and Yami , when Sandhya Cannot bear Suryadev's Heat she Created Chaaya , to take Care of her Children until she returns from a tap , she Warns her not to get close to her husband but Chaaya did so Against Sandhaya , Shanidev was born as dark but suryadev later accepts his colour . Sandhya hates Chaaya and her son Shani , because she thinks that Chaaya Cheated her By getting close to her Husband . So, she gives lot of troubles to Shani and his mother Chaaya with help of Indradev and Rahu. But, however Shani faced all this with help of his karmapal power and his karma. Later, Shani exposes sandhya's evil character in front of suryadev and as a result suryadev chases out Sandhya and announced Chaaya as his official wife. Due to this, Chaaya Get Pregnant Again and they got a Second baby named Badhra but actually because of sandhya's evil plan Bhadhra became against for everyone and finally she killed herself but unfortunately the blame goes to Shani himself and as a result, Chaaya started to hate Shani and she took shani's karmalpal position from himself. Later, frustrating Shani forgave everything and went away and the years had gone.

10 years later, Shani returns and now he marries Dhamini due to some situation and even he earns lot of enemies namely Ravana, Indra and Rahu. However, Shani faces all and try to keep the situation as normally, but due to sevvai, Dhamini curses Shani as he never sees anyone's face, because They were getting far instead of consummating their Marriage.  To avoid these kind of situations, Shani must to take over his karmapal power again but Shani refused. Later, Chaaya understood Shani by Dhamini's proof and speech. Finally, Ravana took a war on Suryaloka to capture all navagrahas but Shani tried to stop him as much as he can. By the end, Shani retakes his karmapal power and even released from bane which Dhamini gave and defeat Ravana and joins with his family. Further he continues his karmapal to everyone.

Cast

Main

 Rohit Khurana as Shani - Partial Incarnation & Student of Shiva; Chaaya's and Surya's son; King of Shaniloka; Kakol's Mount Friend; Karmaphaldaata/Dandnayak; Sandhya's step-son; Bhadra's real brother; Yami and Yam's half-brother; Dhamini and Neelima's husband.
 Kartikey Malviya as Young Shani
 Juhi Parmar as
 Saranyu/Sandhya - The goddess of clouds, First Queen of Suryaloka; Surya's former wife; Vishwakarma's daughter; Yam's and Yami's real mother.
 Chhaya - The goddess of shadows; Second Queen of Suryaloka; Shani's and Bhadra's mother ; Surya's second wife; Sandhya's reflection and spiritual sister; Yam's and Yami's step-mother.
 Tarun Khanna as Lord Shiva/Mahadev
 Tina Datta as Dhamini, Shani's Second  wife;  Shaniloka's queen; Chaaya and Surya's daughter-in-law
 Salil Ankola as Surya - Sun; Suryaloka's king; Chandradev's Brother ; Shani, Bhadra, Yami and Yam's father; Sandhya's Former Husband;  Chaaya's husband.
 Gufi Paintal as Vishwakarma - Architect of Devas; Sandhaya's father; Yam and Yami's Grandfather.
 Kunal Bakshi as Devraj Indra - King of Gods; Sahastra Netra; King of Swarga; Sandhaya's Friend.
 Zohaib Siddiqui as Rahu; Ketu's Brother and Shani's Enemy.
 Tinu Verma as Shukracharya: King of Monsters; Indradev's Enemy. 
 Purvesh Pimple as Kakol, Shani's friend/mount.
 Praneet Sharma as Young Kakol.
 Sachin Yadav as Yamraj/Yama; god of death; Sandhaya's and Surya's son; Yami's brother; Chaaya's step -  son; Shani and Bhadra's half-brother.
 Devish Ahuja as Young Yamraj/Yama
 Kajol Srivastav as Yami/Yamuna; Sandhya and Surya's daughter; goddess of river Yamuna; Chandradev's Ex-Fiance Chhaya's step-daughter; Yam's sister; Shani's and Badra's half-sister.
 Drisha Kalyani as Young Yami/Yamuna

Recurring
 Shahbaz Khan as Ravana
 Saurabh Raj Jain as Narrator
Parvati Sehgal    as Elder Neelima  
 Jannat Zubair Rahmani as Neelima, Shani's power and First Wife.
 Nirbhay Wadhwa as Lord Hanuman : Lord Pawandev and Anjani's Son.
 Krish Chauhan as Young Lord Hanuman
 Ishant Bhanushali as Lord Ganesha/Vinayaka : Lord Mahadev and Parvati's Younger Son; Ridhi and Siddhi's Husband.
 Raj Routh as Lord Kaam Dev 
 Yash Bhojwani and Ayush Pathak as the Ashwini Kumaras
 Shehzan Sayyad as Young Budha
 Preeti Chaudhary as Goddess Parvati
 Vibha Anand / Pooja Sharma as Mahakali
 Diwakar Pundir as Lord Vishnu
 Shweta Vyas as Goddess Lakshmi
 Amardeep Garg as Lord Brahma
 Raj Singh as Chandradev; Surya's Dev Younger Brother and Yami's Ex - Fiance.
 Siddharth Vasudev as Lohitaang Mangal
 Snigdha Akolkar as Anjani, Hanuman's mother
 Sudha Chandran as Sinhika, Rahu's mother
 Kunwar Naveen Jinger as Kakol's father
 Nimai Bali as Sage Vishwamitra
 Kanan Malhotra as King Harishchandra
 Brownie Parashar as King Chitraratha, king of Gandharvaloka
 Vishal Nayak as Vayu/Pawandev, Hanuman's spiritual father
 Himanshu Bamzai as Akash Dev/Jal Devta
 Pheel Mehta / atrali Chattopadhyay as Mohini : Lord Vishnu's Avatar.
 Sampada Vaze as Mandodari : Ravana's Wife
 Vijay Badlani as Narad/Rishiraj, devotee of Vishnu
 Javed Pathan as Kuparn

Awards and nominations

Awards
ITA Award for Best Historical/Mythological Serial, 2017
ITA Award for Best Director-Drama, 2017 - Siddharth Kumar Tewary
ITA Award for Best Child Artiste, 2017 - Kartikey Malviya
 Zee Gold Award for Best Child Actor - Kartikey Malviya
Golden Petal Award for Favorite Child Actor, 2017 - Kartikey Malviya
Golden Petal Award For Best Special Effects, 2017 - Swastik Pictures
Golden Petal Awards for Best Music Fiction, 2017 - Divya

Nominations
ITA Award for Best Teleplay, 2017 - Utkarsh Naithani
ITA Award for Best Actor - Female, 2017 - Juhi Parmar
ITA Award for Best TV Show, 2017 
ITA Award for Best Actor - Male, 2017 - Salil Ankola, Kartikey Malviya
 Zee Gold Award for Best Debue in a Lead Role - Kartikey Malviya

References

External links
Official website
 

2016 Indian television series debuts
Hindi-language television shows
Indian television soap operas
Indian drama television series
Indian television series about Hindu deities
Television shows set in Mumbai
Colors TV original programming
2018 Indian television series endings
Swastik Productions television series